The Temple of the Nymphs was a temple in ancient Rome dedicated to the Nymphs, evidenced in several sources and generally identified with the remains on what is now via delle Botteghe Oscure.

The temple was founded in the 3rd century BC or the early 2nd century BC. It was damaged by a fire in the mid 1st century BC and probably also affected by the citywide fire in 80 AD. This temple was on the Campus Martius.  If still in use by the 4th-century, the temple would have been closed during the persecution of pagans in the late Roman Empire, when the Christian Emperors issued edicts prohibiting all non-Christian worship and sanctuaries.

See also
List of Ancient Roman temples

Bibliography
Daniele Manacorda, s.v. "Nymphae, aedes", in Eva Margareta Steinby (ed.), Lexicon topographicum urbis Romae, III, Roma 1996, pp. 350–351.

References

Nymphs
Roman temples by deity
Nymphs